S7 Airlines operates the following regular services:

Map

Destinations

References

External links 
 S7 Airlines Route Map

Lists of airline destinations
Oneworld destinations